Charles Austin may refer to:

Charles Austin (lawyer) (1799–1874), English lawyer
Charles Austin (politician), mayor of Tallahassee, Florida, in 1831
Charles Austin (comedian) (1878–1944), English music hall comedian
Charles Austin (rugby union) (1892–1980), American rugby union player and coach
 (born 1930), American jazz musician
Charles Austin (journalist) (1944–2018), American journalist
Chuck Austin, American professional wrestler
Charles Austin (high jumper) (born 1967), American athlete
Charlie Austin (born 1987), English footballer

See also

Charles Austen (1779–1852), Royal Naval admiral and brother of Jane Austen, novelist
Chuck Austen, American comic book writer and artist